Abell 671 is a galaxy cluster in the constellation Cancer.

References

Cancer (constellation)
671
Galaxy clusters